Ungestüm (Vehemence) was the name given to a wolfpack of German U-boats that operated during the World War II Battle of the Atlantic from 11 December 1942 to 30 December 1942.

Ungestüm
The group was responsible for sinking nine merchant ships  and damaging one merchant ship .

Raiding History

U-boats

References
Notes

Bibliography
 
 

Wolfpacks of 1942